Royal Air Force Ahlhorn or more simply RAF Ahlhorn, is a former Royal Air Force station located  south east of the centre of Ahlhorn, Lower Saxony and  north of Vechta, Lower Saxony, Germany

Originally, it was a German airbase for Zeppelins.  The Royal Air Force (RAF) disestablished the station and it was closed down in the autumn of 1958 and was transferred to the Bundeswehr. It was a private airport before being converted to a solar park in 2011.

History

First World War 

Built during the First World War in the summer of 1915 for Zeppelins four large hangars were built. The hangers were name "Albrecht" and "Aladin" (northern pair), and "Alrun" and "Alix" (southern pair). On 5 January 1918 Ahlhorn hangars explosion that destroyed the LZ 87 (L 47), LZ 94 (L 46), LZ 97 (L 51), LZ 105 (L 58), and SL 20. Fifteen killed, 134 injured.

Ahlhorn Hangar explosion

Second World War and beyond

During the Second World War the airfield was used as an Advanced Landing Ground before becoming a permanent RAF station.

Current use

Jagdgeschwader 73 was formed at Ahlhorn and Oldenburg on 1 April 1959. Jagdgeschwader 71 of the German Air Force were to take residence from June 1959 with 50 Canadair Sabres, Germany's first operational jet fighter unit. They remained at Ahlhorn until 1961.

Solarpark Ahlhorn

From 2005 the Aircraft Maintenance Service GmbH provided services on widebody aircraft but the company went bankrupt in 2009. A number of solar panels were installed on most of the airfield converting it into Solarpark Ahlhorn. Opening in 2011 the solar panels provide, 17.5 MW. There is only one airstrip in use.

See also

List of former Royal Air Force stations

References

Citations

Bibliography

 - Total pages: 48

External links
Ray Powells' memories of Ahlhorn

Royal Air Force stations in Germany
Airports in Lower Saxony